Chitonomyces elegans is a species of fungi in the family Laboulbeniaceae.

References

External links 
 Chitonomyces elegans at gbif.org

Laboulbeniaceae
Fungi described in 1926